The Algiers Observatory was built in the late 19th century in the Algiers suburb of Bouzaréah, Algeria, North Africa. It participated in the Astrographic Catalogue project, taking the zone between -2 and +4 degrees to expose 1,260 plates between the years 1891 and 1911. At the tail end of that time, the director of the installation was François Gonnessiat.

It is now known as the Centre de Recherche en Astronomie Astrophysique et Géophysique (CRAAG), where it combines astronomy with work in astrophysics, and geophysical research, including the monitoring of earthquakes.

Astronomers 

Astronomers who worked at the observatory include:
 Alfred Schmitt
 Benjamin Jekhowsky
 Frédéric Sy
 Guy Reiss
 Joanny-Philippe Lagrula
 Louis Boyer
 Odette Bancilhon

See also 
 List of astronomical observatories
 List of astronomical societies
 Lists of telescopes

References

External links 
  

Buildings and structures completed in the 19th century
Buildings and structures in Algiers
Astronomical observatories in Algeria